Colombian singer J Balvin has released 5 studio albums, one collaborative album, three mixtapes, three EPs, sixty-nine singles, thirty featured singles, and ten promotional singles. He is one of the best-selling Latin artists, with over 45 million singles and over 4 million album sales (specially based on US sales) 

In 2009, Balvin released his single "Ella Me Cautivó", becoming his first song to chart in the United States, which serves as the first single from his debut album Real that was released in 2009 and received a Gold certification. In the beginning of 2012, he released a mixtape that includes some singles and new songs, only released in the US and Mexico.

On April 24, 2012, Balvin released "Yo Te Lo Dije", the first single from his the -upcoming album, the song was number one in Colombia for eight non-consecutive weeks and became his first charting entry on the Top Latin Songs chart, peaking at number 13, and also became a hit in Romania. The second single, "Tranquila", was a top ten hit in four countries and peaked at the top of the charts in Greece. This resulted in the release of a remix featuring Greek-Albanian singer Eleni Foureira. In 2013, he released the third single "Sola" that was number one in Colombia and charted in Bulgaria. On October 15, 2013, he released "6 AM", which features Farruko, ane was later sent to Latin radio and received heavy rotation, becoming his first number one on the Latin Rhythm Songs chart, and peaked at number three at Billboard Latin Songs chart. The song was certified Gold in Mexico and Spain. That October 2013, Balvin released his first studio album La Familia, which peaked at number ten on the Latin Albums chart, topped the Latin Rhythm Albums chart and received seven Platinum and two Gold certifications. In 2014, he released the fifth single "La Venganza". An expanded version of La Familia, subtitled B Sides, was released on September 16, 2014, that spawned the hit single "Ay Vamos", that eventually topped the charts in Colombia, Dominican Republic and the Latin Rhythm Songs chart.

Albums

Studio albums

Reissued albums

Mixtapes

Extended plays

Singles

As lead artist

As featured artist

Promotional singles

Notes
 Note 1: Uses combined chart entries for "Mi Gente" and "Mi Gente (Remix)"

Other charted songs

Guest appearances

Videography

Footnotes

References

Discographies of Colombian artists
Balvin, J